The Plymouth State Panthers football team represents Plymouth State University in college football at the NCAA Division III level. The Panthers are members of the Massachusetts State Collegiate Athletic Conference, fielding its team in the Massachusetts State Collegiate Athletic Conference since 2013. The Panthers play their home games at Panther Field in Plymouth, New Hampshire.

Their head coach is Paul Castonia, who took over the position in 2003.

Playoffs
The Panthers have made five appearances in the Division III playoffs. Their combined record is 1–5.

Seasons

List of head coaches

Key

Coaches

Notes

References

 
American football teams established in 1970
1970 establishments in New Hampshire